Volley Tricolore is a professional volleyball team based in Reggio Emilia, Italy.  It plays in the second level of the Italian Volleyball League. The club was formed in 2012 with the merging of the local teams of Correggio and Scandiano with Cavriago, which was playing the games of the Italian second tier in Reggio Emilia. 
Volley Tricolore plays its home games in PalaBigi, an arena located in the city and shared with Pallacanestro Reggiana.

History 
Men's volleyball always had a good tradition in Reggio Emilia, but every team (La Torre, Volley Reggiano and Latte Giglio) that played in the highest level got relegated or dismantled due to bankruptcy during the years; however international players like Henk-Jan Held and Krysztof Stelmach and famous coach Ljubomir Travica have been involved in Reggio Emilia's volley. 
Volley Tricolore took the space of Edilesse Cavriago in the Italian second division, but after the first season (2012–13) the club auto-relegated to the third division due to economic difficulties due to the abandon of the project by Correggio. 
In the last three seasons, Tricolore won promotion back to the Serie A2, and played two times in the Promotion Playoffs.

Notable Players and Coaches 
 Santiago Orduna  
 Andrii Diachkov  
 Alessandro Tondo  
 Davide Benaglia  
 Michel Guemart  
 Yvan Arthur Kody 
 Leano Cetrullo 
 Ludovico Dolfo 
 Giulio Silva  
 Thomas Douglas Powell

Team

Italian volleyball clubs
Reggio Emilia